John Henry Round (20 May 1903 – 31 December 1936) was an English footballer who played in the Football League for Bolton Wanderers, Port Vale and Carlisle United in the 1920s and 1930s.

Career
Round played for Brierley Hill Alliance, Cradley Heath and Bolton Wanderers, before joining Port Vale in September 1930. He played 38 Second Division and two FA Cup games in the 1930–31 season, as Vale posted a club record high finish of fifth in the Second Division. He scored three goals in 30 league games in the 1931–32 season, before making 31 appearances in the 1932–33 campaign. However, he appeared just three times at The Old Recreation Ground in the 1933–34 season, and was released at the end of the 1934–35 season. He then moved on to Carlisle United, helping the "Cumbrians" to a 13th-place finish in the Third Division North in 1935–36, before he died on New Year's Eve in 1936.

Career statistics
Source:

References

People from Brierley Hill
English footballers
Association football midfielders
Brierley Hill Alliance F.C. players
Cradley Heath F.C. players
Bolton Wanderers F.C. players
Port Vale F.C. players
Carlisle United F.C. players
English Football League players
1903 births
1936 deaths